Nechvalice is a municipality and village in Příbram District in the Central Bohemian Region of the Czech Republic. It has about 700 inhabitants.

Administrative parts
Villages of Bratřejov, Bratříkovice, Březí, Chválov, Dražka, Hodkov, Huštilář, Křemenice, Libčice, Mokřany, Rážkovy, Ředice, Ředičky, Setěkovy and Vratkov are administrative parts of Nechvalice.

Gallery

References

Villages in Příbram District